Sabatierite (Cu6TlSe4) is a mineral found in the Czech Republic. The composition of the mineral is more likely (Cu4TlSe3) that has been chemically and crystalographically characterized having tetragonal symmetry.</ref> It is named for the French mineralogist Germain Sabatier (born 1923).

See also
 
 List of minerals
 List of minerals named after people

References 

Copper(I,II) minerals
Thallium minerals
Selenide minerals
Orthorhombic minerals